The Reform Party of the United States of America held primary elections for its presidential candidate in May 2008. Ted Weill ran unopposed.

Candidates

Nominee 

Businessperson Ted Weill of Mississippi

Declined to run  
Engineer Alan Banethbuelos Sr of North Dakota

References 

Reform Party of the United States of America presidential primaries
Reform